Dakhla (Berber: Eddaxla / ⴷⴷⴰⵅⵍⴰ) is a city in the disputed territory of Western Sahara, currently occupied by Morocco. It is the capital of the claimed Moroccan administrative region Dakhla-Oued Ed-Dahab.

History 

The area has been inhabited by Berbers since ancient times. Oulad Dlim is an Arab tribe of Himyari from Yemen that settled in the Sahara in the twelfth century. Dakhla was expanded by Spanish settlers during the expansion of their empire. The Spanish interest in the desert coast of Western Africa's Sahara arose as the result of fishing carried out from the nearby Canary Islands by Spanish fishers and as a result of the Barbary pirates menace.

Spanish fishers were seal fur hunters, traders, and whalers along the Saharan coast from Dakhla to Cabo Blanco from 1500 to the present, engaging in whaling for Humpback whales and their calves, mostly around Cape Verde, and the Gulf of Guinea  in Annobón, São Tomé and Príncipe islands through 1940. These fishing activities had a negative impact on wildlife, causing the disappearance or endangering of many species, particularly marine mammals and birds.

The Spaniards established whaling stations with some cod fishing and trading. In 1881, a dock was anchored off the coast of the Río de Oro Peninsula to support the work of the Canarian fishing fleet.

However, it was not until 1884 that Spain formally founded the watering place as Villa Cisneros, in the settlement dated in 1502 by Papal bull. It was included in the enclaves conceded to the Spanish to the east of the Azores islands. In 1884, the settlement was promoted by the Spanish Society of Africanists and funded by the government of Canovas del Castillo. 

The Spanish military, along with the Spanish Africanist Emilio Bonelli, claimed the coast between Cape Bojador and Cabo Blanco for Spain, founding three settlements on the Saharan coast: one in Villa Cisneros, named in honour of Francisco Cardinal Jiménez de Cisneros (1436–1517), the Spanish prelate who was the Grand Inquisitor during the Spanish Inquisition; and another in Cabo Blanco for seal hunting, which was given the name of Medina Gatell; and another in Angra de Cintra with the name of Puerto Badia, in honour of the Arabist and adventurer Domingo Badia. Bonelli got the native inhabitants of the peninsula de Río de Oro to sign an agreement that placed them under the "protection" of the Kingdom of Spain. Due to the presence of the three new settlements, in December 1884 the Spanish Government officially informed the main colonial powers assembled at the Berlin Conference that the Spanish Crown was in possession of the territory lying between Cape Bojador and Cape Blanco.

During the colonial period, Spanish authorities made Dakhla the capital of the province of Río de Oro, one of the two regions of what was known as Spanish Sahara. They built a military fortress and a modern Catholic church. A prison camp also existed at the fort during the Spanish Civil War at which writers such as Pedro García Cabrera were imprisoned.

During the 1960s, the Francoist State also built Dakhla Airport, one of the three paved airports in Western Sahara. It was from Dakhla, then known as Villa Cisneros, that on 12 January 1976, General Gomez de Salazar became the last Spanish soldier to depart what until that moment had been the colony of the Spanish Sahara; faced with Moroccan and Mauritanian pressure, Spanish authorities decided to give up the territory peacefully, instead of undertaking a fight that they believed they could win but would have cost many lives on all sides. Between 1975 and 1979, Dakhla was the provincial capital of the Mauritanian province of Tiris al-Gharbiyya, as Mauritania annexed the southern portion of Western Sahara. Dakhla Airport is used as a civilian airport and by Royal Air Maroc. The 3000 m runway can accommodate a Boeing 737 or smaller aircraft. The passenger terminal covers 670 m2 and is capable of handling up to 55,000 passengers per year.

Dakhla was occupied by Spain from the late 19th century to 1975, when power was then relinquished to a joint administration between Morocco and Mauritania. There was a United Nations-sponsored ceasefire in 1991, but as recently as 2006, most UN member states have refused to recognise Moroccan sovereignty in the area.

In 2020, the Gambia, Guinea, Djibouti, Liberia, Burkina Faso, Equatorial Guinea, Guinea-Bissau, and the Democratic Republic of the Congo opened consulates in Dakhla.

Economy

Tourism and sports 

Dakhla's main economic activity is fishing and tourism. In recent years the town has become a centre for aquatic sports, such as kitesurfing, windsurfing and surf casting, and is known as a centre for water sports.

Golfo de Cintra and the Mauritanian Banc d'Arguin National Park are located in the south.

Oil 
A United States firm Kosmos Energy and its United Kingdom counterpart Cairn Energy began searching for oil in Western Sahara in early 2015.

Oyster industry 
Oyster farming by hand is a traditional practice in Dakhla. Oysters are first sold to people and businesses in Dakhla, then to restaurants in cities like Marrakesh or Casablanca, and then any left are sold to Europe. In April 2015, Vice Media reported that oysters had recently begun to be exported to high-end European restaurants.

Climate 
Dakhla has a mild desert climate (BWh) according to the Köppen climate classification. Dakhla receives an average  of precipitation per year. The temperature averages around  during January, Dakhla's coldest month and around  during September, its warmest month. The temperature seems to be moderated by the Canary Current.

Nature and ecology 

Like most areas in Western Sahara, Dakhla and vicinity areas are very poor in vegetation and are mostly covered by the Sahara Desert. Unlike on land however, sea waters are or had been very rich in sea life due to the highly productive Current System of Canary flowing offshore and the renown Nouadhibou upwelling which is located nearby as well. These environmental factors provide excellent conditions for local fisheries, and result in strong local biodiversity for birds in particular. For these reasons, there has been a UNESCO proposal to create the "Dakhla National Park".

Birds 
Dakhla Peninsula and Cintra Bay are some of the most important wintering grounds for birds especially for waders. The greater flamingo is one of the most iconic birds in the region and there are numerous others known to migrate or inhabit. Some of these are; pelican, great cormorant, gulls (slender-billed, Audouin's, black-backed), larks (sparrow, bar-tailed), terns (little, Caspian, royal, Sandwich), black wheatear, western reef heron, marsh harrier, sparrowhawk, lesser kestrel, laughing dove, great spotted cuckoo, little swift, hoopoe, rock martin, cricket longtail, oystercatcher, bar-tailed godwit, pharaoh eagle owl, and red-knobbed coot.

Bald ibis and buttonquail are also rare on today's Western Sahara.

Several species such as golden nightjar, Sudan golden sparrow, hooded vulture, dark chanting goshawk, speckled pigeon, African mourning dove, blue-naped mousebird, Kordofan lark, red-chested swallow, chestnut-bellied starling, African swallow-tailed kite, tawny eagle, slender-billed curlew, demoiselle crane, Arabian bustard, ostrich, lappet-faced vulture, helmeted guineafowl are seemingly locally rare or extinct, or rather visitors of vagrants.

Mammals 
Terrestrial animals are less diverse than birds, including Ruppell's fox, fennec fox, caracal, hyena, camel, gazelles, addaxes, hares, hedgehog variants, fat sand rat, lesser Egyptian jerboa, bats, and others. Barbary lion and hartebeest became extinct, and possibly local cheetah and North African elephant as well.

The calm, sheltered water of the Dakhla Bay was once an ideal habitat for various forms of marine life, including marine mammals. Most of the local animals such as Mediterranean monk seals and whales (mostly North Atlantic right whales) have disappeared due to histories of slaughter and exploitation like in Cintra Bay. Atlantic gray whales were likely to be seen along the coast before extinction.

On the other hand, monk seals are showing slow but certain recoveries and Ras Nouadhibou holds the world's most notable colony for this species. Nowadays, very small, remnant groups of bottlenose dolphins and Atlantic humpback dolphins are the only marine mammals still seen regularly in Dakhla Bay while there are occasional visits by some other species including orcas while cetaceans like minke, or sei, pilot whales, beaked whales, and dolphins are more common in offshore waters in today's Western Sahara.

Reptiles and others 
Other than mammals, limited varieties of terrestrial reptiles, amphibians, arthropods are present here including lizards, smooth snake, Brongersma's toad, and yellow-tailed scorpion. Sea turtles are also present in the Dakhla region.

Larger fish like groupers, seabasses or croakers inhabit along the coasts. Dakhla and Cintra Bay areas are considered to be spawning grounds for local sardines.

Twin towns – sister cities 

Dakhla is twinned with:
 Crotone, Italy
 Vibo Valentia, Italy

References

External links 

 Official Website

1502 establishments in Africa
Populated places established in 1502
Populated places in Oued Ed-Dahab Province
Populated places in Western Sahara
Port cities and towns in Western Sahara
Regional capitals in Morocco
Provincial capitals in Morocco